The Nguni languages are a group of closely related Bantu languages spoken in southern Africa by the Nguni peoples. Nguni languages include Xhosa, Zulu, Ndebele (sometimes referred to as "Northern Ndebele"), and Swazi. The appellation "Nguni" derives from the Nguni cattle type. Ngoni (see below) is an older, or a shifted, variant.

It is sometimes argued that the use of Nguni as a generic label suggests a historical monolithic unity of the people in question, where in fact the situation may have been more complex. The linguistic use of the label (referring to a subgrouping of Bantu) is relatively stable.

From an English editorial perspective, the articles "a" and "an" are both used with "Nguni", but "a Nguni" is more frequent and arguably more correct if "Nguni" is pronounced as it is suggested.

Classification

Within a subset of Southern Bantu, the label "Nguni" is used both genetically (in the linguistic sense) and typologically (quite apart from any historical significance).

The Nguni languages are closely related, and in many instances different languages are mutually intelligible; in this way, Nguni languages might better be construed as a dialect continuum than as a cluster of separate languages. On more than one occasion, proposals have been put forward to create a unified Nguni language.

In scholarly literature on southern African languages, the linguistic classificatory category "Nguni" is traditionally considered to subsume two subgroups: "Zunda Nguni" and "Tekela Nguni." This division is based principally on the salient phonological distinction between corresponding coronal consonants: Zunda  and Tekela  (thus the native form of the name Swati and the better-known Zulu form Swazi), but there is a host of additional linguistic variables that enables a relatively straightforward division into these two substreams of Nguni.

Tekela languages
 Bhaca 
 Hlubi
 Lala
 Nhlangwini
 Northern Transvaal Ndebele (Sumayela Ndebele)
 Phuthi 
 Swazi

Zunda languages
 Ndebele (Northern Ndebele or 'Zimbabwean Ndebele')
 Southern Ndebele
 Xhosa
 Zulu

Note: Maho (2009) also lists S401 Old Mfengu†.

Characteristics

The following aspects of Nguni languages are typical:
 A 5-vowel system, by merging the near-close and close series of Proto-Bantu. (Phuthi has re-acquired a new series of superclose vowels from Sotho)
 Spreading of high tones to the antepenultimate syllable.
 A distinction between high and low tones on noun prefixes, indicating different grammatical roles, accompanied in some cases by an overt pre-prefix called the augment.
 Development of breathy-voiced consonants, acting as depressor consonants.
 Development of aspirated consonants.
 Development of click consonants.

Comparative data
Compare the following sentences:

Phuthi  = breathy voiced  = Xhosa, Zulu  (in the environment here following the nasal ). Zulu, Swazi, Hlubi  = .

Note:  Phuthi  = IPA .

See also
Ngoni is the ethnonym and language name of a group living in Malawi, who are a geographically distant descendant of South African Nguni. Ngoni separated from all other Nguni languages subsequent to the massive political and social upheaval within southern Africa, the mfecane, lasting until the 1830s.
IsiNgqumo is an argot spoken by the homosexuals of South Africa who speak Bantu languages; as opposed to Gayle, the argot spoken by South African homosexuals who speak Germanic languages. IsiNgqumo is based on an Nguni lexicon.

References

Bibliography

Further reading
 Shaw, E. M. and Davison, P. (1973) The Southern Nguni (series: Man in Southern Africa) South African Museum, Cape Town
 Ndlovu, Sambulo. 'Comparative Reconstruction of Proto-Nguni Phonology'

 
Languages of South Africa
Languages of Eswatini
Languages of Lesotho
Languages of Mozambique
Languages of Zimbabwe